Life Is a Dog is a 1933 Czech comedy film written and directed by Martin Frič.

Cast
 Hugo Haas as Composer Viktor Honzl / Professor Alfréd Rokos
 Theodor Pištěk as Hynek Durdys
 Adina Mandlová as Eva Durdysová
 Světla Svozilová as Helena Durdysová
 Ferdinand Hart as Ralph Morrison
 Alois Dvorský as Landlord
 Jára Kohout as Man buying a record
 František Jerhot as Officer
 Antonín Hodr as Netušil
 Karel Český as Customer
 Přemysl Pražský as Forger

See also
 The Double Fiance (1934)

References

External links
 

1933 films
1933 comedy films
1933 multilingual films
1930s Czech-language films
Czech black-and-white films
Czechoslovak black-and-white films
Compositions by Pavel Haas
Czechoslovak multilingual films
Czechoslovak comedy films
Films directed by Martin Frič
1930s Czech films